AQUA Stadion is a multi-use stadium in Turčianske Teplice, Slovakia.  It is currently used mostly for football matches and is the home ground of ŠK Aqua Turčianske Teplice.  The stadium holds 2,000 people.

Football venues in Slovakia
Buildings and structures in Žilina Region